Lardy is a commune in the Essonne department in Île-de-France in northern France.

Geography
The village lies on the left bank of the river Juine, which forms all of the commune's southern border.

Population
Inhabitants of Lardy are known as Larziacois in French.

See also
Communes of the Essonne department

References

External links

Official website 

Mayors of Essonne Association 

Communes of Essonne